Sábado en la Noche Tiki-Tiki is the sixth album by Mexican singer Verónica Castro, It was released in 1982 "Ven" is theme song to "El derecho de nacer (TV series)" Also in the telenovela Verónica Castro's son Cristian Castro plays her Lost son.

Track listing

 Sábado en la Noche Tiki-Tiki
 Vida Mía (Alejandro Jaen)
 Se Me Va
 Yo Te Besaré
 El Tren
 Ven (Sergio Esquivel)
 Atrévete A Decir
 Piensa En Mí
 Si Los Niños Gobernaran El Mundo (2nd version)
 Siempre Tú

Singles

1982 albums
Verónica Castro albums